Peresvet is a town in Sergiyevo-Posadsky District of Moscow Oblast, Russia, located on the Kunya River (Dubna's tributary)  northeast of Moscow and  north of Sergiyev Posad, the administrative center of the district. Population:

History
It was founded in the summer of 1948 as the settlement of Novostroyka servicing a research institute for bench testing of rocket engines and thermal vacuum chamber testing of spacecraft. During the Soviet period, the settlement was completely under the institute's authority and remained a restricted area until 1992. In the first post-Soviet years, it was managed by the administration of the town of Krasnozavodsk. On December 8, 1999, Novostroyka and a part of Krasnozavodsk containing the research institute were incorporated into the town of Peresvet (named after the medieval military hero Alexander Peresvet). The process was finalized on March 28, 2000.

Administrative and municipal status
Within the framework of administrative divisions, it is, together with five rural localities, incorporated within Sergiyevo-Posadsky District as the Town of Peresvet. As a municipal division, the Town of Peresvet is incorporated within Sergiyevo-Posadsky Municipal District as Peresvet Urban Settlement.

References

Notes

Sources

Boris Chertok. Rockets and People. Vol. II: Creating a Rocket Industry. NASA History Division. Washington, DC. June 2006.

External links
Unofficial website of Peresvet 

Cities and towns in Moscow Oblast
Populated places established in 1948